Platymantis megabotoniviti is an extinct species of frogs in the family Ceratobatrachidae. The species was described from bones of late Quaternary age from caves on Viti Levu, Fiji. P. megabotoniviti is much larger than the other two species of Platymantis known from Fiji, P. vitianus and P. vitiensis.

References

Platymantis
Extinct amphibians
Frogs of Fiji
Amphibians described in 2001